Taaiboschgroet is a village via the D1589 road in the Blouberg Local Municipality under the Capricorn District Municipality in the Limpopo province of South Africa under the leadership of Kgosi Mamadi.

References

Populated places in the Blouberg Local Municipality